Peter Norton (born 1943) is an American programmer, software publisher, author, and philanthropist.

Peter Norton may also refer to:

 Peter Norton (British Army officer) (born 1962), recipient of the George Cross
 Peter Norton, proprietor of Pete's Eats Cafe, a cafe in Wales
 Peter Norton (historian), most known for critique of car-centric approaches

See also
Peter Norton Computing
Peter Hill-Norton (1915–2004), Royal Navy officer